The SS Constitution was an ocean liner owned by American Export Lines, sister ship of the SS Independence.  Both were constructed in the United States and made their maiden voyages in 1951.

History 

Commissioned in 1951, she started her long career sailing on the New York City-Genoa-Naples-Gibraltar route to Europe.

Following service on American Export's "Sunlane" cruise to Europe in the 1950s and 1960s the two ships sailed for American Hawaii Cruises and American Global Line for many years in the 1980s and 1990s; as U.S. ships with U.S. crews meeting the criteria of the Passenger Services Act they were able to cruise the Islands without sailing to a foreign port.

The exact location of the wreck has yet to be discovered.

In popular culture 

SS Constitution was featured in several episodes of the  situation comedy I Love Lucy starring Lucille Ball and Desi Arnaz, starting with episode, "Bon Voyage," aired January 16, 1956.  Lucy Ricardo missed the ship and had to be ferried by air by a then-novel helicopter.

American movie actress Grace Kelly sailed aboard SS Constitution from New York to Monaco for her wedding to Prince Rainier in 1956.

SS Constitution was featured in the 1957 film, An Affair to Remember starring Cary Grant and Deborah Kerr.  Former President Harry S. Truman and his wife Bess sailed back to New York from Europe on the Constitution in the summer of 1958.  The ship was also featured in the beginning and end of an episode of the Naked City TV series titled "No Naked Ladies in Front of Giovanni's House!" aired April 17, 1963.  The ship also featured prominently in the Magnum, P.I. television series episode titled "All Thieves on Deck" aired January 30, 1986.

References

External links 

History and photos of Constitution and Independence
Photo page for Magnum, P.I. episode "All Thieves on Deck"
First-hand travel experience near the end of Constitution's career

 

Type P3 ships
Ships built in Quincy, Massachusetts
1950 ships
Passenger ships of the United States
Ocean liners
Maritime incidents in 1997
Shipwrecks in the Pacific Ocean
Cruise ships of the United States
Ships of American Export-Isbrandtsen Lines